Brass instrument valves are valves used to change the length of tubing of a brass instrument allowing the player to reach the notes of various harmonic series. Each valve pressed diverts the air stream through additional tubing, individually or in conjunction with other valves. This lengthens the vibrating air column thus lowering the fundamental tone and associated harmonic series produced by the instrument.
Valves in brass instruments require regular maintenance and lubrication to ensure fast and reliable movement.

Piston valve

The first musical instruments with piston valves were developed just after the start of the 19th century.

Stölzel valve
The first of these types was the Stölzel valve, bearing the name of its inventor Heinrich Stölzel, who first applied these valves to the French horn in 1814. Until that point, there had been no successful valve design, and horn players had to stop off the bell of the instrument, greatly compromising tone quality to achieve a partial chromatic scale.

In a Stölzel valve, the air enters through the bottom of the valve casing, up through the hollow bottom end of the piston, and through a port to the valve loop. The air is then led through an oblique port in the piston to a short tube connecting the valves where it is then directed through the second valve and out the bottom.
This type of valve, however, had inherent problems. It forced the air to double back on itself and the 90 degree turns disrupted the bore, causing significant undesired back-pressure. These problems were improved upon later by the double-piston valve.

Double-piston valve

The double-piston valve, also called the Vienna valve or pumpenvalve, is a type of valve that preceded the modern single piston Périnet valve. It was first produced in a trumpet in 1821 by Christian Friedrich Sattler of Leipzig. In this valve type, the simultaneous movement of two pistons bends the air flow in two right angles to introduce an additional valve loop. These turns cause constrictions in the bore, that make the instrument harder to play.
At first, the two pistons were operated by a lever connected with braces, but the later Vienna model of these valves was operated by long rods connecting the pistons to spring-loaded keys on the other side of the instrument.

While they have fallen out of favor compared to modern valves in almost all places, they are called “Vienna valves” because they are still used almost exclusively in Vienna, Austria, where players prefer the smooth legato and mellow, natural horn-like timbre. The Vienna system was in common use in Germany on many brass instruments including trumpets up to 1850.

Périnet valve 
The modern piston valve found in the majority of valved brass instruments today was invented by François Périnet in 1838 and patented in 1839. They are sometimes called Périnet valves after the inventor. They work by diverting air obliquely through ports in the stock of the valve, so that a loop of tubing is included in the air stream, thus lowering the pitch. The stock of the valve is cylindrical and moves up and down through a larger cylindrical casing.

Adolph Sax invented instruments with 6 independent piston valves (three for each hand), but only the most dexterous musicians were able to play them. The long lengths of extra tubing used by each of the six valves also made the instruments heavy and cumbersome to play.

Modern valve brass instruments not using either rotary or Vienna valves use this type of valve in a set of three configured to lower the instrument by two, one, and three half-steps respectively, which in combination lower the instrument pitch by up to a tritone. Some instruments (e.g. the tuba and euphonium) add a fourth valve that further lowers the pitch by a perfect fourth.

Rotary valve

Joseph Riedlin is credited with the first use of rotary valves on brass instruments in 1832.
The rotary valve works using a short circular rotor (also known as a stock, or "plug") housed in a larger cylindrical valve casing, and rotating on a spindle. Elbow-shaped ports or "knuckles" in the rotor direct the airflow into an extra length of valve tubing when the rotor is rotated 90° and thus lowering the pitch. The ports can be cut or drilled from a rotor made from a solid piece of brass, or sometimes they can be short pieces of tubing brazed into an assembled or cast rotor.

Many other innovations in traditional rotary valve design and manufacture have taken place since the late 20th century to improve their resistance and other playing characteristics. Willson Rotax and CAIDEX valves and Greenhoe valves use vents between the ports to allow air to escape through the rotor as the rotor switches positions. This eliminates the "pop" heard or felt with a traditional rotary valve. Other designs use a larger diameter rotor to accommodate port tubing with a circular or constant-area cross-section, which helps with perceived "stuffiness" of valves; earlier designs used narrow elliptical tubes to fit into a smaller diameter rotor. German maker Meinlschmidt have patented an "Open Flow" rotor with self-lubricating spiral channels in the rotor spindle and open, circular ports.

Horns almost always have rotary valves, and they are found on most orchestral F and CC tubas and cimbassos. In most European orchestras, particularly in Germany, they are also used for trumpets, bass trumpets, and Wagner tubas.

Trombone F attachment valves are usually rotary, although the desire to maintain "openness" through the valve section by eliminating 90° bends in the valve and tubing has led to many radical valve designs since the 1970s, such as the Thayer axial flow valve and Hagmann valve.

Thayer/Axial Flow valve

Axial flow valves are an alternative for the traditional rotary valve found on trombones with valve attachments. Patented by Orla Ed Thayer in 1978, it uses a conical rotor with the spindle axis parallel to the tubing, and deflecting the direction of the airflow by only 28° or less. Several subsequent patents attempted to address its reliability and leakage problems using spring tensioners and lighter rotor materials, and a 2011 patent greatly improved the action, stability and reliability of the valve by mounting bearings at both ends of the rotor spindle.
Vincent Bach use this design for their "Infinity Valve" on their "AF" trombones, replacing the older Thayer design on their now discontinued "T" designation trombones.

Hagmann valve

Several other designs of rotary valve have arisen from attempts to create air paths through the valve that avoid the tight kinks in the tubing caused by the traditional rotor ports. In the most widely adopted of these, the Hagmann valve, the rotor has three ports: one straight through, and two when the valve is engaged, which bend only 45° and arise through the top of the valve casing, instead of through the rotor plane. The S.E. Shires "Tru-Bore" valve is similar but uses a completely straight path in the default position, as well as simpler manufacturing and improved reliability. Earlier three-port valve designs, such as the Miller valve and the Selmer "K" valve, use a taller cylinder to deflect the air though two S-shaped knuckles, rather than emerging through the top of the valve casing.

References

External links 
National Music Museum, Elements of Brass Construction

Brass instrument parts and accessories
Air valves